Belle Glade may refer to:

 Belle Glade, Florida, a small city next to Lake Okeechobee in Palm Beach County
 Belle Glade Camp, Florida, a census designated place adjacent to the city of Belle Glade
 Belle Glade culture, an archaeological culture in the Lake Okeechobee basin and Kissimmee River Valley
 Belle Glade (archaeological site), the type site for the Belle Glade culture
 Belle Glade State Municipal Airport, a public-use airport adjacent to the city of Belle Glade